KAL is a company specialising in ATM software for bank ATMs, self-service kiosks, and bank branch networks. All KAL products are multivendor, Windows-compliant and conform to the industry XFS standard. KAL is the world's number two supplier of true multivendor ATM software. KAL supplies its software to major global banks including China Construction Bank, Citibank and UniCredit.

History 
The company was established in 1989 by Dr. Aravinda Korala; hence Korala Associates Limited. KAL is headquartered in Edinburgh, Scotland. KAL also has office locations elsewhere in the UK, plus in the US, Europe, India, China, Japan, Malaysia and Australia. In 2011 KAL won the Queen's Award for Enterprise in the International Trade category.

Products
KAL's major product is self-service software for ATMs and kiosks. In 2012, KAL introduced the RTM (Retail Teller Machine). The RTM dispenses vouchers instead of cash meaning banks can operate in previously inaccessible areas while still offering the complete feature set of an ATM. KAL was the first ATM software company to deliver its products certified for Microsoft Windows 8 – just one week after the new operating system was officially launched by Microsoft in November 2012.

Industry standards and organisations
KAL is a participatory member of the ATM and self-service industry and belongs to the following industry associations and standards:

 Product suite conformed to the WOSA 1.11 industry standard in 1995 (later renamed to XFS in 2000)
 The Payment Card Industry Security Standards Council
 Membership of ATM Industry Association (ATMIA)

References

External links
Official KAL site
Official RTM site

Technology companies of the United Kingdom